Siemens may refer to

Siemens, a German family name carried by generations of telecommunications industrialists.

Notable surnames 
 (Ernst) Werner (since 1888) von Siemens (known as Werner) (1816, Gehrden – 1892), inventor, founder of Siemens AG
 (Carl) Wilhelm Siemens (known as (Charles) Wilhelm or Sir William Siemens) (1823, Lenthe – 1883), brother of Werner von Siemens
 Carl (Heinrich) von Siemens (1829, Menzendorf – 1906), brother of Werner von Siemens
 Georg von Siemens (1839–1901), banker and politician, nephew of Werner von Siemens
 Alexander Siemens (1847, Hanover – 1928), cousin of Werner von Siemens
 Arnold (since 1888) von Siemens (1853, Berlin – 1918), son of Werner von Siemens
 (Georg) Wilhelm (since 1888) von Siemens (known as Wilhelm) (1855, Berlin – 1919), son of Werner von Siemens
 Carl Friedrich von Siemens (1872, Berlin – 1941), son of Werner von Siemens
 Hermann (Werner) von Siemens (1885, Berlin – 1986), nephew of Werner von Siemens
 Ernst von Siemens (1903, Kingston upon Thames – 1990), nephew of Werner von Siemens
 Peter von Siemens (1911, Berlin – 1986), nephew of Werner von Siemens
 Hermann Werner Siemens (1869, Charlottenburg – 1969), geneticist
 Jacob "Jake" (John) Siemens (1896, Altona, Manitoba – 1963), a Canadian social entrepreneur and adult educator of Mennonite descent

Fictional characters 
 Yasch Siemens, a fictional Mennonite man from Armin Wiebe's novel The Salvation of Yasch Siemens

References

Low German surnames
German-language surnames
German families
 
Surnames from given names
Russian Mennonite surnames